Dilip Rayamajhi (born 16 September 1974) is a Nepalese film actor, producer and choreographer.

He started his career as a dancer and went on to become an assistant dance director. He got his first movie break in a video film as a side dancer and then he was offered the "big break" in the movie "Bhanubhankta".

Filmography

References

External links

1976 births
21st-century Nepalese male actors
Living people
Nepalese choreographers
Nepalese male dancers
Nepalese film producers
Actors from Kathmandu
Nepalese male film actors
21st-century Nepalese dancers
20th-century Nepalese dancers